Talal or Telal is an Arabic masculine given name and a surname. People with the name include::

Given name
 Talal of Jordan (1909–1972), Jordanian king
 Talal Aklan, Yemeni politician
 Talal Alkernawi (born 1954), Israeli Arab politician
 Talal Arslan (born 1955), Lebanese politician
 Talal Asad (born 1932), American anthropologist
 Talal Al-Bloushi (born 1986), Qatari footballer
 Talal Abu-Ghazaleh (born 1938), Jordanian businessman
 Talal Khalfan (born 1980), Omani footballer
 Talal Maddah (1940–2000), Saudi Arabian singer
 Talal Al-Nuaimi (born 1988), Emirati basketball player
 Talal Qureshi, Pakistani musician
 Talal bin Abdullah Al Rashid (1823–1868), ruler of Hail
 Talal bin Abdulaziz Al Saud (1931–2018), Saudi royal
 Talal al-Sharif, Jordanian politician
 Talal Yassine, (born 1972), Lebanese Australian businessman

Surname
Chaïbia Talal (1929–2004), Moroccan painter

Arabic-language surnames
Arabic masculine given names